Flory E. Mauriocourt (April 7, 1933 – July 26, 2011) was an American football coach, who coached the very first Case Western Reserve Spartans football team after the federation of Western Reserve University and Case Institute of Technology into Case Western Reserve University.

Head coaching record

College football

References

1933 births
2011 deaths
American football quarterbacks
Baseball third basemen
Case Western Spartans baseball coaches
Case Western Spartans baseball players
Case Western Spartans football coaches
Case Western Spartans football players
High school football coaches in Ohio
Baldwin Wallace University alumni
Players of American football from Cleveland
Coaches of American football from Ohio
Baseball players from Cleveland